Elachista megagnathos is a moth of the family Elachistidae that is found in Russia (the Russian Far East and the southern Ural Mountains).

The head and thorax are shining silvery grey-brown. The forewing ground colour is blackish brown with a bronze lustre and silvery marks with goldish lustre. The hindwings are brown.

Adults have been recorded in July in the Russian Far East.

References

megagnathos
Moths described in 1990
Endemic fauna of Russia
Moths of Asia
Moths of Europe